The 2017 Grand Prix Miguel Indurain was a one-day road cycling race that took place on 1 April 2017. It was the 68th edition of the GP Miguel Indurain and was rated as a 1.1 event as part of the 2017 UCI Europe Tour.

The race was won by Simon Yates.

Teams
Seventeen teams were invited to take part in the race. These included five UCI WorldTeams, two UCI Professional Continental teams, nine UCI Continental teams and a Spanish national team.

Result

References

External links

2017 UCI Europe Tour
2017 in Spanish road cycling
2017